Woods v Walters, an important case in the South African law of lease, was an action to enforce the execution and performance of a contract for the lease by the defendant to the plaintiff of certain land with a furnished house and other buildings thereon.

Where the parties are shown to have been ad idem as to the material conditions of a contract, the onus of proving an agreement that legal validity shall be postponed until the due execution of a written document lies upon the party who alleges it. Damages claimed as an alternative to a decree of specific performance of a contract must be proved and ascertained in the ordinary way; they should not be assessed by the court as a punishment for contumacity.

On the evidence, the parties had reached a binding agreement. The court held, however, that there was no agreement that they should not be bound until a written lease had been executed. Accordingly, the court held that plaintiff was entitled to an order for specific performance or, in the alternative, damages.

See also 
South African law of lease

References 
 Woods v Walters 1921 AD 303.

Notes 

1921 in South African law
Appellate Division (South Africa) cases
1921 in case law
South African contract case law
South African property case law